Roy Felipe Barahona Fuentes (born March 20, 1986) is a Honduran swimmer, who specialized in butterfly events. Barahona qualified for the men's 200 m butterfly at the 2004 Summer Olympics in Athens, by receiving a Universality place from FINA, in an entry time of 2:06.14. He challenged six other swimmers in heat one, including 15-year-old Sergey Pankov of Uzbekistan. He set a lifetime best of 2:05.99 to pull off a third-place finish by 0.28 of a second behind Indonesia's Donny Utomo. Barahona failed to advance into the semifinals, as he placed thirty-fourth overall in the preliminaries.

References

1986 births
Living people
Honduran male swimmers
Olympic swimmers of Honduras
Swimmers at the 2004 Summer Olympics
Swimmers at the 2003 Pan American Games
Pan American Games competitors for Honduras
Male butterfly swimmers
21st-century Honduran people